Carlos Ernesto Becerra is an Argentine Radical Civic Union politician.

On October 23, 2000, Becerra became Secretary General of the Presidency under President Fernando de la Rúa. Shortly afterwards he was appointed by de la Rúa as Secretary of Intelligence from 2000 to 2001 to replace the previous Secretary, Fernando De Santibañes.

See also
List of Argentine Secretaries of Intelligence

References

Year of birth missing (living people)
Living people
Government ministers of Argentina
Argentine Secretaries of Intelligence
Radical Civic Union politicians
Place of birth missing (living people)